Lagoon-A-Beach is a water park that is situated inside the Lagoon Amusement Park located in Farmington, Utah.  Lagoon-A-Beach currently has ten water slides that fall into three main categories: tube slides, body slides, and drop slides.  Its name is a play on Laguna Beach.

Tube Slides
These slides must be ridden with an inner tube. The inner tubes available at Ruby's tubes can be rented for five dollars a day and when returned, the customer will be given a coupon for a 32 oz. drink.

Back Door: The Back Door is a blue slide that twists alongside the Sea Snake body slide.
Outrigger: The Outrigger is a unique tube slide.  At the very top, the rider is required to sit in an inner tube in a large pool of water.  A life guard then grabs hold of the rider's tube and directs it toward a slide.  After the tube goes down the slide it ends up in another pool, where another life guard directs it down another slide.  In all, the rider goes through five slides and six pools of water on this ride. People sometimes want to stay in the Outrigger longer (for more exposure to the water and more time in the pools) they will intentionally fall out of their tubes and walk around the pool clumsily trying to get back into their tubes. Though the lifeguards may get annoyed at this as it can cause traffic and could cause harm to the participant.

Body Slides
Pipeline: The Pipeline is forty feet tall and is well loved by many people who visit Lagoon-A-Beach.  However, it has been criticized for being rather slow, especially towards the top.
Wipeout: This slide consists of one, large, clockwise loop.  Many patrons love this ride because the centrifugal force generated on it causes them to go very fast.
Twist: This slide is so named because it actually twists around another water slide named "Shout".
Shout: Patrons on this water slide typically attain high speeds.  Towards the bottom they go through many twists and turns and are usually thrown from left to right very rapidly.  While some consider this to be unpleasant, others believe it to be exhilarating.
Sea Snake: The Sea Snake is the tallest of all of the body slides at Lagoon-A-Beach.  Like the name implies, this slide has many twists and turns.
Rip Curl: This slide passes by tall trees and has fully enclosed areas as well as open. It is the newest slide in Lagoon-A-Beach.

Drop Slides
Liquid Lightning: This slide consists primarily of one large drop, and speed.
The Drop: Like Liquid Lightning, this ride ends with a very long drop.  However, before they plummet, riders go through several twists and turns reminiscent of a typical water slide.

Lagoon (amusement park)
Tourist attractions in Davis County, Utah
Water parks in Utah